Marcel Siem (born 15 July 1980) is a German professional golfer who plays on the European Tour.

Career
Siem was born in Mettmann. He turned professional in 2000 and came through Qualifying School to join the European Tour in 2002. He was again successful at Qualifying School in 2002.  His first win on the European Tour came at the 2004 Dunhill Championship. Siem then had to wait eight years before picking up his second win in 2012 at the Alstom Open de France. This victory ensured Siem's place in the 2012 Open Championship and his first appearance in a World Golf Championship at the WGC-Bridgestone Invitational. His best year end ranking on the Order of Merit was 14th in 2012.

In March 2013, Siem won for the third time on the European Tour at the Trophée Hassan II in Morocco. He went wire-to-wire to win by three strokes over David Horsey and Mikko Ilonen. He finished the tournament 51st in the world rankings, just missing out on an invitation to the Masters Tournament.

In November 2014, Siem claimed victory at the BMW Masters, the first event of the Race to Dubai finals series and his fourth overall on the European Tour. He won in a sudden death playoff over Ross Fisher and Alexander Lévy with a birdie on the first extra hole.

Siem played on the Challenge Tour in 2021. He won the Le Vaudreuil Golf Challenge in July.

In February 2023, Siem ended an eight-year winless drought at the Hero Indian Open. He shot a final-round 68 to beat Yannik Paul by one shot.

Siem has represented Germany at the World Cup in 2003, 2004, and 2006. In 2006 he was Bernhard Langer's teammate in the second winning German team in the World Cup.

Amateur wins
1999 Spanish Amateur Championship, Sherry Cup (Spain)

Professional wins (7)

European Tour wins (5)

1Co-sanctioned by the Sunshine Tour
2Co-sanctioned by the Professional Golf Tour of India

European Tour playoff record (2–0)

Challenge Tour wins (1)

Other wins (1)

Other playoff record (1–0)

Results in major championships

CUT = missed the half-way cut
"T" = tied
NT = No tournament due to COVID-19 pandemic

Summary

Most consecutive cuts made – 2 (three times, current)
Longest streak of top-10s – 0

Results in World Golf Championships
Results not in chronological order before 2015.

QF, R16, R32, R64 = Round in which player lost in match play
"T" = tied

Team appearances
Amateur
European Boys' Team Championship (representing Germany): 1997
European Youths' Team Championship (representing Germany): 1998
Eisenhower Trophy (representing Germany): 1998, 2000
European Amateur Team Championship (representing Germany): 1999

Professional
World Cup (representing Germany): 2003, 2004, 2006 (winners), 2013
Royal Trophy (representing Europe): 2012

See also
2007 European Tour Qualifying School graduates
2021 Challenge Tour graduates
2022 European Tour Qualifying School graduates

References

External links

German male golfers
European Tour golfers
People from Mettmann
Sportspeople from Düsseldorf (region)
People from Ratingen
1980 births
Living people